Neo-Aristotelianism may refer to:

 Neo-Aristotelianism (literature)
 Neo-Aristotelianism (philosophy)